Guiteau is an unincorporated community in Oregon County, in the U.S. state of Missouri.

The community had its start as a country store named after presidential assassin Charles J. Guiteau, which was intended to rival nearby Garfield. Besides the store, the community had a church, and a schoolhouse.

References

Unincorporated communities in Oregon County, Missouri
Unincorporated communities in Missouri